Fade to Black is a 1980 American psychological horror comedy film written and directed by Vernon Zimmerman, and starring Dennis Christopher, Eve Brent and Linda Kerridge. It also features Mickey Rourke and Peter Horton in minor roles. The plot follows a shy and lonely cinephile who embarks on a killing spree against his oppressors while impersonating classic film characters.

Plot
Eric Binford is a hollow, chain smoking, socially awkward and unlikeable young man who is also an obsessed film addict whose love of old films extends far beyond his job at a Los Angeles film distributor's warehouse and endless late-night film screenings in his bedroom. For his vast knowledge, he has been bullied by his friends and family. His singular obsession eventually turns into psychosis after he crosses paths with Marilyn O'Connor, an Australian model and Marilyn Monroe lookalike who becomes the physical embodiment of his cinematic desires.

After Marilyn unintentionally stands up Eric on their first date, Eric becomes homicidally unbalanced, transforming himself into a gallery of classic film characters—including Dracula, The Mummy and Hopalong Cassidy—and sets out to destroy his oppressors, starting with his abusive and crotchety, wheelchair-using, ex-dancer, Aunt Stella, pushing her wheelchair down a staircase to her death (reenacting a scene from Kiss of Death (1947)) and making this look like an accident. Eric attends her funeral dressed as Tommy Udo (Richard Widmark's role from the aforementioned film).

Eric then dresses up as Count Dracula to attend a midnight screening of Night of the Living Dead (1968) at a local cinema. Afterwards, he bursts in on Marilyn in the shower while looking for an autograph in a scene straight out of Psycho (1960); he escapes and targets a sex worker who had insulted him earlier. She trips, falling to her death, and Eric licks her blood off his fingers.

Eric becomes more and more unhinged from reality as the film progresses and his antisocial behavior in public becomes more erratic and violent. A few nights later, Eric dresses up as the cowboy Hopalong Cassidy, when he shoots and kills Richie, a boorish co-worker who taunted him on a regular basis and beat him up after welching on a bet that Eric won. Not long after, Eric dresses up as The Mummy and drives his mean and vindictive boss, Mr. Berger, into suffering a deadly heart attack while he is working late at night at his distribution warehouse.

Finally, Eric dresses up as gangster Cody Jarrett (from White Heat (1949)) and kills a sleazy filmmaker named Gary Bially, who stole his idea as his own for an upcoming feature film inspired by Ali Baba and the Forty Thieves (to be called "Alabama and the Forty Thieves") at a barber shop in broad daylight, which finally gives away his identity. Eric then eventually works his way toward Marilyn, hoping to lure her to his side.

Investigating the murders is a criminal psychologist named Dr. Jerry Moriarty, who tries to find a pattern to the murders and find Eric, to help or stop him, with the assistance of a friendly policewoman who has discovered that Eric's Aunt Stella is actually his mother. Moriarty's investigation is hampered by his own mean-spirited and nasty boss, Captain Gallagher, who tries to stop Moriarty's investigation because Gallagher wants to take all the credit of finding the killer for himself.

This all leads to Eric luring Marilyn to a photography studio where he drugs her to reenact a scene from The Prince and the Showgirl (1957) which is interrupted when Dr. Moriarty arrives, and Eric is forced to run with Marilyn at his side. This leads to the Mann's Chinese Theatre where the insane Eric is shot by the police on the roof of the building while reenacting Cody Jarrett's death scene in White Heat. Eric then falls off the roof to his apparent death on the pavement below.

Cast

Production
A labor of love for the director (who stated that it wasn't a horror film in an interview after its release), it starred Dennis Christopher whose previous credits included the 1979 Academy Award-winning Breaking Away and Robert Altman's 1978 ensemble piece A Wedding. The film also co-starred Australian actress Linda Kerridge (whom Yablans rewrote the screenplay after meeting her at a party one year prior) due to her likeness to Monroe yet fell into obscurity afterwards. Many problems during production included a grueling shooting schedule and tension from the cast. Actress Gwynne Gilford was pregnant during production, and gave birth after it ended to future movie star Chris Pine. 

The novelization of the film was written by Ron Renauld.

Release

Box office
Released in the United States on October 17, 1980, Fade to Black commercially unsuccessful in its home country yet was more popular in France. It grossed approximately $15 million worldwide.

Lawsuits
In late December 1980, the U.S. Film Office of Northbrook, Illinois, and William Boyd Enterprises of Beverly Hills, California filed copyright infringement lawsuits against Fade to Black, alleging that the filmmakers did not properly authorize usage of film clips from Hopalong Cassidy. The lawsuit alleged that the portrayal of Cassidy in the film portrayed Boyd and his titular character with "contempt and ridicule," and sought an injunction to remove the film from theaters.

Critical response

Roger Ebert from Chicago Sun Times awarded the film 3/4 stars, calling it "a weird, uneven, generally intriguing thriller" while Time Out wrote, "The film aspires to hommage, it's true, but its references are altogether too obvious."

Author and film critic Leonard Maltin awarded the film 1.5 out of 4 stars, writing that the film was "[an] interesting idea ruined by excessive violence, [and] a poor performance by Christopher."

The film was nominated for multiple Saturn Awards (Christopher for Best Actor, Zimmerman for Best Director and Best Horror Film), with Eve Brent winning for Best Supporting Actress. It also won the Bronze Mask at the Taormina Film Fest.

Home media
It was released on VHS home video on September 26, 1996 by Media Home Entertainment.

It was first released on DVD on August 24, 1999 by Anchor Bay Entertainment. It was released on Blu-ray for the first time on November 27, 2020 by Vinegar Syndrome.

References

Sources

External links
 
 
 
 Fade to Black (1980) at BFI
 Fade to Black on MUBI
 Trailer on TRAILERS FROM HELL with commentary by director Gillian Horvat on YouTube

1980 films
1980 horror films
1980 independent films
1980s American films
1980s comedy horror films
1980s English-language films
1980s horror thriller films
1980s mystery thriller films
1980s serial killer films
1980s slasher films
American comedy horror films
American horror thriller films
American independent films
American mystery thriller films
American serial killer films
American slasher films
Films about filmmaking
Films about Hollywood, Los Angeles
Films about mental health
Films directed by Vernon Zimmerman
Films scored by Craig Safan
Films set in a movie theatre
Films set in Los Angeles
Films shot in Venice, Los Angeles